Swamp turtle or swamp terrapin may refer to:

 Burmese eyed turtle (Morenia ocellata)
 African helmeted turtle (Pelomedusa subrufa)
 West African mud turtle (Pelusios castaneus) 
 Diamondback terrapin (Malaclemys terrapin)
 Western swamp turtle (Pseudemydura umbrina)

Animal common name disambiguation pages